Kevin Dockery (born January 8, 1984) is a former American football cornerback. He was signed by the New York Giants as an undrafted free agent in 2006. He played college football at Mississippi State.

Dockery has also been a member of the St. Louis Rams and Pittsburgh Steelers. He earned a Super Bowl ring with the Giants in Super Bowl XLII against the New England Patriots.

College career
Dockery played in 44 games with 37 starts at cornerback for the Bulldogs and was credited with 195 tackles (117 solo) he also had 6 interceptions, 22 pass breakups and 2 sacks.

Professional career

New York Giants
Dockery signed with the New York Giants as an undrafted free agent in 2006.  His first career interception was a 96-yard return for a touchdown against the Dallas Cowboys in week 7 of the 2006 NFL season.  He finished his rookie season with 35 tackles, two interceptions, and seven pass deflections in 14 games.

Dockery missed three games in 2007 with injuries, but in 13 games played he recorded 46 tackles, eight passes defended and a forced fumble.

In his third season in 2008, Dockery recorded his third career interception.  In a game against the Philadelphia Eagles, he recovered a field goal blocked by Justin Tuck and returned it 71 yards for his second career touchdown.

A restricted free agent in the 2009 offseason, Dockery signed his one-year, $1.545 million tender offer on April 13.

St. Louis Rams
Dockery signed with the St. Louis Rams on March 22, 2010.

Pittsburgh Steelers
On August 17, 2011, Dockery signed with the Pittsburgh Steelers. He was released on August 28, 2011.

References

External links
New York Giants bio
Official website

1984 births
Living people
African-American players of American football
American football cornerbacks
Mississippi State Bulldogs football players
New York Giants players
People from Hernando, Mississippi
Pittsburgh Steelers players
Players of American football from Mississippi
St. Louis Rams players
21st-century African-American sportspeople
20th-century African-American people